Love... The Album is a hybrid compilation/studio album by British singer Cliff Richard, released by EMI on 12 November 2007 in the UK. The five new studio tracks were produced by Michael Omartian. It reached No. 13 in the UK Albums Chart.

There are two versions of this album, the CD version and the digital download version. The difference is on track 12, the CD version is "For Life" whilst the digital download version is "My Pretty One".

The five new recordings on the album are cover songs: "Waiting for a Girl Like You" (originally by Foreigner), "If You're Not The One" (originally by Daniel Bedingfield), "When I Need You" (originally recorded by Leo Sayer), "When You Say Nothing at All" (originally by Keith Whitley) and "All Out of Love" (originally by Air Supply). The album launched only one single, a cover of Leo Sayer's "When I Need You" which reached no. 38 in the UK Singles Chart.

Background
On 30 October 2007, before releasing the CD version of Love... the Album, EMI and the Cliff Richard Organisation decided that for 2 weeks, if there is a high enough demand for the digital download version of the album (which was 400 copies), then the price will drop from £7.99 to £3.99. For each album being downloaded, the price of the album drops by 1 pence.

During the two-week period, Richard said:

On 8 November 2007, it was announced that the £3.99 price tag for the album has been secured and that all people who have downloaded it during the two-week period would all pay £3.99 instead of the original price. All copies downloaded contributed to the first week of the UK Albums Chart.

Track listing

Digital download version

Charts and certifications

Weekly charts

Year-end charts

Certifications

References

Cliff Richard albums
2007 albums
Albums produced by Michael Omartian
EMI Records albums